Medardo Joseph Mazombwe (24 September 1931 – 29 August 2013) was a cardinal of the Catholic Church. He was the former archbishop of the Roman Catholic Archdiocese of Lusaka (1996–2006) and Bishop of the Roman Catholic Diocese of Chipata (1970–1996).

Pope Benedict XVI elevated Mazombwe to the status of Cardinal-Priest of Santa Emerenziana a Tor Fiorenza at a consistory on 20 November 2010.

He held several senior positions in the local and regional church, such as Zambia Episcopal Conference president (1972–1975; 1988–1990; 1999–2002), and as chairman of the regional conferences under Association of Member Episcopal Conferences in Eastern Africa (A.M.E.C.E.A.) (1979–86). He was an ardent campaigner for Zambia's debt cancellation in the mid-1980s, through the Jubilee movement campaign and spearheaded several new developmental projects in many parts of the country including the Mumpanshya area of Chongwe.

References

1931 births
Zambian Roman Catholic archbishops
Zambian cardinals
2013 deaths
Cardinals created by Pope Benedict XVI
People from Lusaka
Roman Catholic bishops of Chipata
Roman Catholic archbishops of Lusaka